Charles Coles Diggs Sr. (January 2, 1894 – April 25, 1967) was the first African-American Democrat elected to the Senate of the State of Michigan.

Born in Tallula, Mississippi, to James J. Diggs and Lilly Granderson, Diggs moved to Detroit in 1913, where he owned a successful funeral home on the lower east side.

Political career
A follower of Marcus Garvey during the 1920s, Diggs first became involved in politics as a Republican, and then changed affiliation to the Democrats in 1932.  Diggs was an early organizer of the Black Democratic Clubs in Detroit.

Diggs was a member of the Michigan State Senate from the 3rd District from 1937-1944, and was a delegate from Michigan to the 1940 Democratic National Convention.

Diggs gained a reputation as a friend of organized labor and a civil rights champion.  Diggs had a personal story of traveling to Lansing in 1938 for his first session in the Legislature, and then being denied a room because of his race at the Olds Hotel across the street from the State Capitol.  Diggs was forced to live during the week in one of Lansing's segregated neighborhoods.  Diggs responded with a series of bills aimed at strengthening Michigan's civil rights laws, and the Diggs Law (Equal Accommodations Act of 1938—Act 117, signed by Governor Frank Murphy) made discriminatory service based on color, race or creed a misdemeanor.

In 1944, Diggs was defeated in the Democratic primary.  Later, Diggs was an unsuccessful candidate for U.S. Representative from Michigan (1st District) as a Republican in the 1948 primary, and then as a Democrat in the 1952 primary.

Criminal convictions
On January 22, 1944,  Diggs and 19 other current or former state legislators were charged with accepting bribes.  Diggs was convicted and sentenced to three-to-five years in prison.  In 1945, Diggs was convicted in a different bribery case.  On July 20, 1946, Diggs and 18 other legislators were charged with accepting bribes to vote against a banking bill.  The case was dropped when the witness for the prosecution, Charles F. Hemans, refused to testify.

Personal life and death
He was rooted in his family's business, the House of Diggs, which at one time was said to be Michigan's largest funeral home.

Diggs was father to politician Charles C Diggs, Jr.  The elder Diggs was a member of the Elks.

Diggs committed suicide at Detroit Memorial Hospital after suffering a cerebral hemorrhage and a stroke, jumping from his fourth-floor hospital room window to his death. He was interred at Detroit Memorial Park in Warren.

References

1894 births
1967 deaths
Michigan state senators
People from Issaquena County, Mississippi
African-American state legislators in Michigan
Date of death missing
Michigan Democrats
Michigan Republicans
Politicians from Detroit
American funeral directors
1967 suicides
20th-century African-American politicians
20th-century American politicians
Suicides by jumping in the United States
Suicides in Michigan
African-American men in politics